The Toyota MiniAce was a small utility vehicle built by Toyota from November 1967 until November 1975. It shared many parts with the Toyota Publica, especially the Publica P20 Pickup. In Japan, it was sold through the Toyota Corolla Store and Toyota Auto Store networks. Because it shares many parts with the popular Toyota Publica and the highly collectable Toyota Sports 800 most MiniAces have been used for parts and very few survive. Its exterior dimensions and engine displacement, while very small, do not conform to "kei car" Japanese government regulations.

History 

The concept origina he particularly small turning circle of only . It entered the market in November 1967, as a truck or as a panel van. Priced low, in consideration of its  payload, the MiniAce sold well, especially due to its compliance to the Japanese annual road tax obligation.

True success followed once the MiniAce Van (UP100V) and MiniAce Coach, a seven-seater minibus, were added in August 1968. Soon, though, more modern challengers like Mitsubishi's Delica began whittling away at the market share of the MiniAce. Its toughest competitor, the 1969 Datsun Sunny Cab received a water-cooled 1.2 liter engine for 1972. Nonetheless, Toyota's 1967 engagement with Daihatsu meant that Toyota was to relinquish this portion of the market, and no more serious investments in the MiniAce were made. After December 1969, manufacture was transferred from Toyota's Takaoka plant and was now shared between Hino, Daihatsu, and the Fuji Auto Body Co., Ltd. which made the bodies.

In the early seventies the MiniAce received a very light facelift, mainly consisting of a plastic shield with a "Toyota" script located just beneath the front windshield. As the air-cooled U engine would have a hard time passing new, stricter emissions standards for 1976, production was halted in November 1975. Although the MiniAce had become too small and spartan for the now more sophisticated Japanese consumers, it was still a strong seller in other Asian markets. The larger LiteAce and all new TownAce took over, with Daihatsu's Hijet covering the lower end of the segment.

In December 2011, Toyota returned to this market segment with the introduction of the Toyota Pixis Van and Truck, rebadged Daihatsu Hijets.

References

MiniAce
1960s cars
1970s cars
Rear-wheel-drive vehicles
Vehicles introduced in 1967
Cars powered by boxer engines
Minibuses
Microvans
Cab over vehicles
Cars powered by 2-cylinder engines